Macroantonaria is a genus of beetles in the family Megalopodidae. It contains only one species, Macroantonaria robustipes, found in the Democratic Republic of the Congo.

References

Megalopodidae genera
Monotypic Chrysomeloidea genera
Taxa named by Maurice Pic
Beetles of the Democratic Republic of the Congo
Endemic fauna of the Democratic Republic of the Congo